Axel Eduard Fischer (born 5 May 1966) is a German politician. He is a member of the CDU and has been a member of the German parliament from 1998 to October 2021, representing Karlsruhe-Land since 2002.

Early life and education
From 1989 until 1995, Fischer studied mechanical engineering at the University of Karlsruhe.

Political career
In parliament, Fischer first served on the Committee on Education, Research and Technology Assessment from 1998 until 2009. Since the 2009 elections, he has been a member of the Budget Committee and the Audit Committee. In this capacity, he serves as rapporteur on the annual budget of the Federal Ministry of Labour and Social Affairs (BMAS) and the Federal Employment Agency (BA). He is also a member of the German Parliament's Berlin-Taipei Parliamentary Circle of Friends.

In addition to his committee assignments, Fischer was member of the German delegation to the Parliamentary Assembly of the Council of Europe (PACE) from 2010 until 2018. In 2009 he succeeded Edward O'Hara as chairman of the Committee on Technology and Aerospace. He also served as rapporteur on Armenia from 2011 until 2014 (alongside John Prescott and later Alan Meale) and on Ukraine in 2017. From 2014 until 2018, he was one of the Assembly's vice-presidents.

Following the 2017 German federal election, the CDU/CSU parliamentary group decided against including Fischer in its list of nominees for Germany's new 18 person-strong delegation to PACE; the decision has been linked in media reports to his alleged role in limiting PACE's efforts to hold the Azerbaijan government under Ilham Aliyev accountable for human rights abuses as well as possible corruption.

In early 2020, Fischer co-founded an informal cross-party group of MPs from the CDU, CSU and FDP parties who opposed a potential coalition government between CDU/CSU and the Green Party.

By March 2021, the CDU/CSU parliamentary group's leadership announced that Fischer would be replaced as chair of the Audit Committee. He was succeeded by Carsten Körber.

In October 2021, Fischer was not again candidate for Bundestag by 2021 German federal election

Other activities
 European Security and Defense Association (ESDA), Member
 World League for Freedom and Democracy (WLFD), Member

Political positions
In response to the Greek government-debt crisis, Fischer and Rüdiger Kruse proposed in 2015 that German holidaymakers whose holiday spending helps boost the Greek economy should be reimbursed 500 euros by the German state on their return, on condition that the hotel and restaurants they visited have paid their taxes.

In June 2017, Fischer voted against Germany's introduction of same-sex marriage.

Controversy
In 2017, the Union parliamentary group withdrew Fischer's appointment to the new Bundestag delegation at the Council of Europe because of his implication in the "Caviar Diplomacy" corruption scandal in PACE. 

In March 2021, Fischer became the subject of an investigation over allegations that he took payments for political activity in the interests of the Azerbaijani government. On March 4, 2021, following a request from the Munich Public Prosecutor's Office, the German Bundestag lifted Fischer's parliamentary immunity. Subsequently, the BKA conducted a search at his parliamentary office in relation to the public prosecutor's investigation, on the initial suspicion of corruption, into payments from the "Azerbaijani Laundromat" money-laundering scheme to active and former members of the Bundestag for lobbying activities to promote Azerbaijani interests at the Council of Europe.

Personal life
Fischer is married for the second time and has six children. His father is the former President of the University of Applied Sciences in Karlsruhe Werner Fischer and one of his brothers is the swiss politician and pastor Lutz Fischer-Lamprecht

References

External links 
 Official Website (in German)
 Council of Europe Parliamentary Assembly member list

1966 births
Living people
Politicians from Karlsruhe
German Protestants
Members of the Bundestag for Baden-Württemberg
Members of the Bundestag 2017–2021
Members of the Bundestag 2013–2017
Members of the Bundestag 2009–2013
Members of the Bundestag 2005–2009
Members of the Bundestag 2002–2005
Members of the Bundestag 1998–2002
Members of the Bundestag for the Christian Democratic Union of Germany